Steve Svitak (born June 1, 1945) is a retired Canadian football player who played for the Saskatchewan Roughriders, Edmonton Eskimos and BC Lions. He played college football at Boise State University.

He also played for the Buffalo Bills, Houston Oilers and the Oakland Raiders in the NFL.

References

1945 births
Living people
Edmonton Elks players
Boise State Broncos football players